Tinnea is a genus of plants in the family Lamiaceae first described in 1867.  It is native to sub-Saharan Africa. It was named in honour of the Dutch explorer Alexine Tinne.

Species
 Tinnea aethiopica  - widespread from Mali to Somalia south to Mozambique; naturalized in Trinidad & Tobago
 Tinnea antiscorbutica  - DRC, Zambia, Angola
 Tinnea apiculata  - eastern Africa from Rwanda to Mozambique
 Tinnea barbata  - Eswatini, northern South Africa
 Tinnea barteri  - western Africa
 Tinnea benguellensis  - Angola
 Tinnea coerulea  - DRC, Zambia, Angola
 Tinnea eriocalyx  - DRC, Angola, Botswana, Namibia
 Tinnea galpinii  - Eswatini, Mozambique, South Africa
 Tinnea gossweileri  - Angola
 Tinnea gracilis  - Tanzania to Zambia
 Tinnea mirabilis  - Tanzania
 Tinnea physalis  - Tanzania
 Tinnea platyphylla  - DRC
 Tinnea rhodesiana  - South Africa, Namibia, Zimbabwe, Zambia, Angola, Mozambique 
 Tinnea somalensis  - Ethiopia
 Tinnea vesiculosa  - Tanzania, Malawi
 Tinnea vestita  - Zimbabwe, Zambia, Angola, Botswana
 Tinnea zambesiaca  - Zimbabwe, Zambia, Malawi, Mozambique

References

Lamiaceae
Lamiaceae genera